Argamasilla de Calatrava is a municipality in the Province of Ciudad Real, Castile-La Mancha, Spain. It has a population of 5,408.

Municipalities in the Province of Ciudad Real